Athletics were contested at the 2005 Islamic Solidarity Games in Mecca, Saudi Arabia from April 12 to April 16, 2005.

Medal summary

Medal table

References
gbrathletics.com
Results

2005
Islamic Games
2005 Islamic Solidarity Games
2005 Islamic Solidarity Games